Henry Robert Lapwood  (1 November 1915 – 26 April 2007) was a New Zealand soldier and a National Party politician.

Biography

Born at Tuakau, just south of Auckland, Lapwood was raised by an uncle and aunt, his mother having died when he was four and his father when he was ten. He attended Tuakau and Dilworth Schools in Auckland, before working first on a dairy farm in Awakeri, and later as a police officer in Invercargill. At the start of the Second World War in 1939 he joined the New Zealand Army and was a warrant officer class 1 in the 2nd Division. On 26 June 1942, he was appointed the Regimental Sergeant Major of 18 New Zealand Armoured Regiment. The next day, during fighting at Minqar Qaim leading up to the First Battle of El Alamein, he was wounded by enemy artillery fire, resulting in the loss of use of one arm.

He moved to Rotorua in 1947 with his wife Cath (née Gow) and purchased a grocery business. In , he stood as the National Party candidate for the Rotorua electorate, which to his surprise he won, defeating Labour incumbent Ray Boord. Lapwood represented Rotorua for six terms from 1960 until his retirement in 1978. He was senior whip from 1970 to 1974, and was known for having the loudest voice in Parliament, attributed to his previous role as RSM during the war. He was Minister of Tourism and Minister in charge of Publicity and of the Government Printing Office from 1975 to 1978, in the Muldoon government.

In 1990, Lapwood was awarded the New Zealand 1990 Commemoration Medal, and in the 1992 New Year Honours he was appointed an Officer of the Order of the British Empire, for public services.

His wife Cath died in 2003. Lapwood died on 26 April 2007 after a short illness, and was survived by five daughters.

Notes

References

1915 births
2007 deaths
Members of the Cabinet of New Zealand
New Zealand military personnel of World War II
New Zealand National Party MPs
New Zealand police officers
New Zealand Officers of the Order of the British Empire
Members of the New Zealand House of Representatives
New Zealand MPs for North Island electorates
People from Tuakau
20th-century New Zealand politicians